The National Aerospace Laboratories (NAL) is India's first and largest aerospace research firm established by the Council of Scientific and Industrial Research (CSIR) in Delhi in 1959. The firm closely operates with HAL, DRDO, and ISRO and has the primary responsibility of developing civilian aircraft in India. It concentrates on research in advanced topics in aerospace and related disciplines.  

Based in Bengaluru, the NAL employs a staff of about 2500 of which 350 are full-time R&D professionals.[citation needed] NAL is equipped with the Nilakantan Wind tunnel Centre and a computerized fatigue test facility. The NAL also has facilities for the investigation of failures and accidents in the domain of aerospace engineering.

History 
On 1 June, 1959, the National Aeronautical Research Laboratory (NARL) was set up in Delhi, with Dr. P Nilakantan as its first Director. In March of 1960, it set up an office in the stables of the Palace of Maharaja of Mysore on Jayamahal Road, Bangalore, as the National Aeronautical Laboratory (NAL). The first Executive Council was chaired by J. R. D. Tata. Its members included Prof. Satish Dhawan and the designer Dr. V M Ghatage. Originally started as the National Aeronautical Laboratory, it was renamed National Aerospace Laboratories (NAL) in April 1993. The renaming aimed to reflect its growing involvement in the Indian space program and its multidisciplinary activities.

Flosolver
Flosolver was a series of Indian supercomputers designed and assembled by the NAL. Work began on the initial computer in 1986 to help with computational fluid dynamics.

Current Projects

RTA-70 (Indian Regional Jet)
The HAL/NAL Regional Transport Aircraft (RTA) or Indian Regional Jet (IRJ) is a regional airliner being designed by National Aerospace Laboratories (NAL) and to be manufactured by Hindustan Aeronautics Limited (HAL). The aircraft is planned to be a turboprop or a jet with a capacity of 80–100 passengers. Its basic version will have 70–90 seats (RTA-70)

The 90 seater variant of the aircraft is being designed as of 2021 and is expected to enter service in 2026.

Products

Aircraft

 NAL HANSA - Light-weight Trainer Aircraft

The maiden flight of CSIR-NAL's light trainer aircraft, now called Hansa, took place on 17 November 1993. The aircraft is an ab-initio two-seat, all-composite aircraft, certified by the DGCA in the year 2000 under JAR-VLA certification. DGCA has promoted the use of the Hansa-3 by various flying clubs; a total of fourteen aircraft are in operation. Thirteen aircraft are currently operational in India. Ten of these are with various flying clubs and one is with IIT-Kanpur.
 NAL/HAL SARAS - Multirole light transport aircraft

SARAS had its maiden flight on 29 May 2004. The aircraft took off at 08:15 and flew for about 25 minutes. SARAS is the first civilian aircraft designed and developed in India. Two prototypes have been built and flown (176 flights) by ASTE (IAF) flight crew. The third prototype aircraft (production standard) is under production at CSIR-NAL. Features include composite wing VERITy (Vacuum Enhanced Resin Infusion Technology), empennage, rear pressure bulkhead, front fuselage top skin, and control surfaces. The aircraft will be equipped with an all-glass cockpit including EICAS and 3-axis autopilot (limited authority). It will be powered by 2x1200 SHP turboprop PT6A-67A engines (Pratt & Whitney) driving 5-blade MT-Propellers. SARAS is capable of flying up to 30,000ft (cabin altitude 8,000ft) and is capable of operation from short runways. Certification is in progress by CEMILAC and is to be completed by 2013. SARAS has been designed for many roles including executive transport, light package carrier, remote sensing, air ambulance, etc.

 NAL NM5 - Five Seater - General Aviation Aircraft
C-NM5 is the country's first public-private partnership (PPP) for the development of civil transport aircraft in collaboration with M/s Mahindra Aerospace Pvt Ltd (MAPL). On 1 September 2011, a milestone event for India's first public-private partnership in aircraft development, and a bold dream became reality; C-NM5 designed & developed jointly by CSIR-NAL & Mahindra Aerospace successfully undertook its first flight in Australia. C-NM5 is powered by a 300 HP piston engine driving a 3-blade propeller cruising at a speed of 160 knots with a maximum AUW (All Up Weight) of 1525 kg; a glass cockpit is a customer option. It is an ideal aircraft for air taxis, air ambulances, training, tourism, and cargo.

Unmanned aerial vehicles
 NAL / ADE Black Kite
 NAL / ADE Golden Hawk
 NAL / ADE Pushpak

See also
 Hindustan Aeronautics Limited
 Mahindra Aerospace
 Tata Advanced Systems

References

HAL Abandons RTA-70 Project, HAL abandons Regional Transport Aircraft project, The tirbune, 29 November 2016

External links
 National Aerospace Laboratories
 CSIR, India
 

Aerospace
Research institutes in Bangalore
Council of Scientific and Industrial Research
Companies based in Bangalore
Aerospace companies of India
1959 establishments in Delhi